Keri Lynn Hilson (born December 5, 1982) is an American R&B singer, songwriter and actress. She was born and raised in Decatur, Georgia and spent most of her youth working with producer Anthony Dent as a songwriter and background vocalist for several R&B and hip hop artists. By the age of 14, Hilson had secured a record deal with the girl group D'Signe, which later disbanded. She attended Oxford College of Emory University in Georgia while she continued writing songs for artists including Britney Spears, The Pussycat Dolls, and Mary J. Blige, with the production and songwriting team The Clutch. In 2006, Hilson signed with American producer and rapper Timbaland's record label Mosley Music. Her breakthrough came in 2007 after appearing on Timbaland's single "The Way I Are", which topped charts around the world.

Hilson's music style is R&B, hip hop, and pop; womanhood, sexual intimacy, and love are the typical themes. Her musical influences come from her father's side of the family. Hilson's debut studio album, In a Perfect World..., was released in 2009, and debuted at number four on the US Billboard 200 chart, eventually being certified gold by the Recording Industry Association of America (RIAA). The album spawned the hit singles "Knock You Down" (featuring Kanye West and Ne-Yo), "Turnin Me On" (featuring Lil Wayne), and "I Like". It also earned Hilson two Grammy Award nominations for Best New Artist and Best Rap/Sung Collaboration for "Knock You Down". Her second studio album, No Boys Allowed, was released in 2010 and was somewhat less successful than its predecessor; however, it did include the platinum single "Pretty Girl Rock" (featuring Kanye West).

Hilson has also contributed to various charities and pursued a career in acting, and she continues to record and perform music. She has contributed in the fight against HIV and AIDS, helped various relief efforts for natural disasters, and become involved with several educational organizations. In 2012, Hilson made her acting debut in the romantic comedy film Think Like a Man. Her achievements include a BET Award, MOBO Award, NAACP Image Award and two Soul Train Music Awards.

Life and career

1982–2007: Early life and career beginnings 
Keri Lynn Hilson was born on December 5, 1982, in Decatur, Georgia. Hilson's mother owns and runs a day care center and her father was a developer who served in the Army. She was raised in a middle class family and an African-American neighborhood. Her brother is Kip and her sisters are Kelsee, Kye and Kaycee. Hilson and her siblings did not attend a school within the neighborhood, stating that "they shipped us off for an hour to get to school every day. It was just that important for us to maintain the life that they had created". From the age of 12, Hilson wanted to pursue a musical career, after watching television talent shows, Star Search and Showtime at the Apollo. Her mother then hired a piano teacher to give her piano lessons; however, Hilson wanted to become a singer and therefore "converted those sessions into vocal lessons, accompanying the teacher on piano". By the age of 14, Hilson had secured a record deal with the girl group D'Signe, who later disbanded.

Hilson's first official work as a songwriter was "Jump", written for a Japanese R&B singer Michico's debut album I Do (2002). Hilson spent most of her teenage years working with producer Anthony Dent as a songwriter and background vocalist for the likes of Usher, Ludacris, Kelly Rowland, Toni Braxton, Ciara and Polow da Don. After graduating from Tucker High School in the DeKalb County School District, Hilson attended Oxford College of Emory University and Emory University in Atlanta for three years and studied a course in theater. She continued working as a songwriter and background vocalist during her schooling years. Hilson eventually stopped working with Dent, and began working more with Polow da Don. She also became a member of the songwriting and production team, The Clutch. Together, they wrote Mary J. Blige's "Take Me as I Am" (2006), Omarion's "Ice Box" (2006), Ciara's "Like a Boy" (2006), The Pussycat Dolls' "Wait a Minute" (2006) and Britney Spears' "Gimme More" (2007). In 2006, Polow introduced Hilson to American rapper and producer Timbaland, who then signed her to his record label, Mosley Music Group. In November 2006, Hilson was featured on American rapper Lloyd Banks' single "Help" for his album Rotten Apple (2006).

The following year, Hilson was featured on three singles; in June, on Timbaland's song "The Way I Are", the second single from his album Shock Value (2007); on Rich Boy's "Good Things" with Polow da Don; and thereafter, in December, on Timbaland's song "Scream" with Nicole Scherzinger, the fifth single from Shock Value. Out of the three singles, "The Way I Are" achieved the most success, topping nine charts around the world.

2008–2009: In a Perfect World... 

In 2008, Hilson appeared in the music videos for Usher's single "Love in This Club" and Ne-Yo's single "Miss Independent". Her debut studio album, In a Perfect World..., was released on March 24, 2009. The album contained pop-oriented R&B songs. It was initially planned to be released the previous year; however, the album was delayed several times because Hilson wanted to make sure it came out to her liking, stating "I'm just a perfectionist. I have had many [release dates], but it's all for a good cause. The label wants to make sure the album has its proper release, and I'm thankful for that. Very grateful, even though fans look at it like it's a bad thing." In the United States, In a Perfect World... debuted at number four on the Billboard 200 chart, and number one on the Top R&B/Hip-Hop Albums chart, with first-week sales of 94,000 copies. By October 2009, the album was certified gold by the Recording Industry Association of America (RIAA). Its first single, "Energy", released in May 2008, peaked at number 78 on the US Billboard Hot 100 chart and number 21 on the US Hot R&B/Hip-Hop Songs chart. It reached the top 50 in the United Kingdom, and peaked the highest in New Zealand at number two, and was certified gold in that country. Hilson also featured on three singles in 2008; in June, on rapper Nas' song "Hero"; in September, on Kardinal Offishall's "Numba 1 (Tide Is High)"; and thereafter, in October, on Chris Brown's song "Superhuman".

"Return the Favor", featuring Timbaland, served as the second international single from Hilson's In a Perfect World... album, while "Turnin Me On" featuring Lil Wayne, was released as the second US single. The latter achieved commercial success, reaching number 15 on the Billboard Hot 100, and number two on the Hot R&B/Hip-Hop Songs chart, eventually being certified platinum in the United States. "Turnin Me On" spent 10 weeks on the Hot 100. Hilson and Lil Wayne performed the song on Jimmy Kimmel Live! on March 27, 2009. The next single, "Knock You Down" featuring Kanye West and Ne-Yo, achieved more success, reaching number three on the Billboard Hot 100 and number one on the Hot R&B/Hip-Hop Songs chart, eventually being certified two times platinum. The song spent 31 weeks on the Hot 100 and 30 weeks on the Hot R&B/Hip-Hop Songs chart. It also reached the top ten in Canada, Ireland, The Netherlands, New Zealand and the United Kingdom. Hilson and West performed "Knock You Down" on the Late Show with David Letterman on May 4, 2009. "Make Love", "Slow Dance", and "Change Me" featuring Akon, were released as the album's fourth, fifth and sixth US singles, respectively. Hilson performed "Slow Dance" with The Roots on Late Night with Jimmy Fallon on September 18, 2009.

Hilson, along with Gym Class Heroes, Gorilla Zoe and T-Pain, were supporting acts on Lil Wayne's I Am Music Tour in North America. At the 2009 BET Awards, she was nominated in four categories, including Best New Artist, Best Female R&B Artist, as well as Viewer's Choice and Best Collaboration for "Turnin Me On" with Lil Wayne. She eventually won the Best New Artist category. In 2009, Hilson was featured on five singles; "Number One" with R. Kelly, "She Don't Wanna" with Asher Roth, "Everything, Everyday, Everywhere" with Fabolous, "Medicine" with Plies, and on the remix of Sean Paul's song, "Hold My Hand". Hilson was nominated for Breakthrough Artist and Favorite Soul/R&B Female Artist at the 2009 American Music Awards. The re-released edition of In a Perfect World..., in January 2010, included the single "I Like", which reached number one in Germany, Poland and Slovakia, and peaked within the top ten in Austria, Norway and Switzerland. At the 52nd Grammy Awards, Hilson was nominated for Best New Artist and Best Rap/Sung Collaboration for "Knock You Down" with Kanye West and Ne-Yo.

2010–2014: No Boys Allowed and acting debut 

During the first half of 2010, Hilson guest featured on rapper Trina's single "Million Dollar Girl", and on T.I.'s single "Got Your Back". In April 2010, it was made known that she had replaced Jennifer Hudson as the new face of the cosmetics and personal care products company Avon. "Breaking Point" was released as the first single from Hilson's second studio album, No Boys Allowed, in September 2010; it only appeared on the US Hot R&B/Hip-Hop Songs Chart at number 44, and spent two weeks on the chart. On December 2, 2010, Hilson was one of the many female artists who performed at the VH1 Divas Salute the Troops concert, where she sang "Turnin Me On", "Knock You Down", "Pretty Girl Rock", and a duet with American country music duo Sugarland on the Aretha Franklin song "Think". No Boys Allowed was released on December 21, 2010. Described as a "girl power album", No Boys Allowed was primarily of the R&B and pop genres. Despite the album's title, Hilson stated "it's not about excluding men. It's more about women understanding that there comes a time in your life when you want a man. A real man. A grown up. Not a boy. And that's not a bad thing." Speaking of the songs on the album, she explained "I write from a female perspective, but I'm also telling men what women are really thinking and feeling about them". In the United States, No Boys Allowed debuted at number 11 on the Billboard 200, and number seven on the Top R&B/Hip-Hop Albums chart, with first-week sales of 102,000 copies. Although the album sold 8,000 copies more than Hilson's debut album In a Perfect World..., it failed to match that album's debut chart position of number four on the Billboard 200, due to No Boys Allowed being released during the festive season with several Christmas albums debuting inside the top-ten. As of February 2011, the album has sold 205,500 copies in the United States.

Hilson achieved success with the album's second single, "Pretty Girl Rock", which reached number 24 on the Billboard Hot 100 and number four on the Hot R&B/Hip-Hop Songs Chart, eventually being certified platinum. The song spent 14 weeks on the Hot 100 and four weeks on the Hot R&B/Hip-Hop Songs Chart. It reached the top twenty in Germany and New Zealand, and top 30 in Austria and Slovakia. Hilson promoted "Pretty Girl Rock" with live performances on televised shows, including The Tonight Show with Jay Leno, the Late Show with David Letterman and Jimmy Kimmel Live!. "One Night Stand" featuring Chris Brown, and "Lose Control (Let Me Down)" featuring Nelly, were released as the album's third and fourth singles, respectively. In 2011, she was featured on British rapper Chipmunk's single "In the Air", for his album Transition (2011). In April 2011, Hilson, along with many other R&B and hip hop acts, traveled to Australia to be part of its biggest urban music festival, Supafest. At the 2011 BET Awards, Hilson was nominated for Best Female R&B Artist and Video of the Year for "Pretty Girl Rock". In July 2011, she was a supporting act on the second leg of Lil Wayne's I Am Still Music Tour in North America, before embarking on her first headlining European tour in October. Hilson made her acting debut in the romantic comedy film Think Like a Man, released on April 20, 2012. She also appeared alongside Vin Diesel in the sci-fi action film Riddick (2013), in a brief role as a prisoner allowed to escape to make room for Riddick.

2015–present: Third album 

During an interview on 106 & Park on October 25, 2011, Hilson revealed that she has already begun recording her third studio album. She explained, "There's some people in the world that aren't gon' like this album coming from me. As I was experiencing the world, there were things that I was also experiencing on a personal front, and in my music it's coming out. There's a specific few people who ain't gon' like to listen to this album. Very emotional, I'll say that." She further explained in an interview with The Boombox that she's working on a new sound for the album, and described it as a mixture of her first two albums with some surprising elements thrown in. Hilson also said a release date had not been confirmed yet, saying "I just write about my experiences and keep the release dates far, far from me. When I feel that I have [good material] is when I will give it to the label. But I'm not quite there yet. I'm still working." After a five-year musical hiatus for Hilson, it was leaked on March 14, 2016, that the album would be named L.I.A.R., an acronym for Love Is a Religion. L.I.A.R. will have contributions from Chris Brown, Danja, Timbaland and Polow Da Don. In July 2017, Hilson was featured on Zambian singer Tiwah Hillz's single "Beautiful".

Hilson announced that she will be releasing new music in summer 2019, nine years after her previous album. She is performing on Femme It Forward Tour in summer 2019 alongside Mya, Brandy, Ashanti, Monica and Amerie. In October 2019, Hilson referred to the album as untitled but said that it was in the final stages of mixing and production.
In April 2020, Keri was featured on Ghanaian musician Stonebwoy's song "Nominate". She later recommended Rihanna for a future collaboration with the Ghanaian dancehall musician.

Artistry 

Hilson's music is generally R&B, hip hop and pop. Her debut album, In a Perfect World..., consists of a pop/R&B style, with elements of electro music. Many of the album's themes deal with relationships, physical attraction and lovemaking. Hilson said, "lyrically it's a very vulnerable album. You know, I definitely didn't want to paint myself as perfect on this project. Instead, I wanted it to be something that was very relatable, especially to women".

Her second album, No Boys Allowed, displays a wide variety of styles, including pop, R&B, hip hop, soul, acoustic, electronic and reggae. Hilson describes the album as "more self-assured. It's a lot more aggressive". Kristin Macfarlane of The Daily Post noted that the album is "pure girl power and about being sexually confident, and confident as a woman; not putting up with crap relationships and getting your way".

Hilson sings with "smooth vocals". Following the release of her debut album, Sophie Bruce of BBC Music expressed that, "there's no denying Hilson has a great voice, but it lacks the feisty edge of [Nicole] Scherzinger, [Mary J.] Blige or [Beyoncé] Knowles". Mark Nero of About.com commented, "Keri's voice, while strong, isn't particularly distinctive or memorable". Hilson has stated that her musical influences come from her father's side of the family. "My grandmother would sing in the choir; while my dad—while he was in college—sang and recorded with a quartet. ... it was definitely my dad's Southern side that impacted on me musically". Hilson's father also introduced her to artists such as Sade, Anita Baker, The Blind Boys of Alabama, Lisa Stansfield, Take 6 and Stevie Wonder. In addition, she cites Michael Jackson and Lauryn Hill as her idols.

Activism and philanthropy 
Besides her career in music, Hilson has also been involved with several charities. In January 2010, she teamed up with Akon on the charity single "Oh Africa". All proceeds of the single benefited underprivileged African youth. The following month, Hilson joined the extended list of artists during the recording session of the single, "We Are the World 25 for Haiti", to benefit victims of the 2010 Haiti earthquake. On May 25, 2010, she performed at the Virginia Stand Up! A Call to Action benefit concert, organized by Chris Brown to help with continued relief efforts in Haiti. On October 21, 2010, Hilson attended Collins Academy High School in Chicago as part of the Get Schooled National Challenge and Tour, a "program aimed at increasing high school and college graduation rates and promoting the importance of education". A year later, she received a Get Schooled Award for her involvement with the program. In 2011, Hilson contributed in the fight against AIDS by posing in retail-clothing company H&M's celebrity-driven collection for Fashion Against AIDS. 25% of all sales from the collection were donated to the Designers Against Aids charity. Hilson contributed to the It Gets Better Project, a project which aims to prevent suicide among LGBT youth.

In June 2011, Hilson became an ambassador for MTV Staying Alive, a foundation which raises awareness and prevention of HIV and AIDS. In September 2011, she lent her support to US First Lady Michelle Obama's Let's Move! campaign, which aims to combat childhood obesity. She made T-shirts for the campaign that read "Pretty Girls Sweat", and exercised with the young women at The Educational Alliance's Sirovich Senior Center in New York City on September 24. During Hilson's visit in Africa in November 2011, she stopped by an orphanage to visit her young fans who had lost their families during the 2010–2011 Ivorian crisis. She gave each orphan a "care" package, which consisted of bookbags, T-shirts, sunglasses, notebooks and an electric keyboard. In April 2012, Hilson worked with DoSomething.org to encourage young people to take part in the nationwide Epic Book Drive by bringing books to local people in need. In a press release, she stated: "Joining DoSomething.org's newest effort to provide for people in need with Epic Book Drive was the easiest decision ever!. I truly believe providing access to those who want to learn is the key to bettering lives around the country. And helping kids find healthy outlets, such as books, has always been a passion of mine. So my involvement here is a natural fit."

Hilson has also become an active opponent of 5G wireless technology, and was criticized for falsely claiming it caused the coronavirus pandemic.

Personal life
In 2011, Hilson posed nude for the May issue of Allure magazine.

Discography 

Studio albums
 In a Perfect World... (2009)
 No Boys Allowed (2010)

Filmography

Tours 
Headlining
European Tour (2011)

Supporting
I Am Music Tour (2009) (with Lil Wayne)
I Am Still Music Tour (2011) (with Lil Wayne)
Femme It Forward Tour (2019) (with various artists)
The Millennium Tour: Turned Up! (2022) (with various artists)

Awards and nominations 

|-
| style="text-align:center;"|2007
|"The Way I Are" (Timbaland featuring D.O.E. and Keri Hilson)
|MTV Video Music Award for Monster Single of the Year
|
|-
|rowspan="14" style="text-align:center;"|2009
|rowspan="4"|Herself
|American Music Award for Favorite Female Soul/R&B Artist
|
|-
|American Music Award for Breakthrough Artist
|
|-
|BET Award for Best New Artist
| 
|-
|BET Award for Best Female R&B Artist
|
|-
|rowspan="2"|"Turnin Me On" (with Lil Wayne)
|BET Award for Viewer's Choice
|
|-
|BET Award for Best Collaboration
|
|-
|In a Perfect World...
|Urban Music Award for Best Album
|
|-
|rowspan="4"|Herself
|Urban Music Award for Best Female Act
|
|-
|MOBO Award for Best International Act
|
|-
|MOBO Award for Best R&B/Soul Act
|
|-
|Soul Train Music Award for Best New Artist
|
|-
|"Turnin Me On" (with Lil Wayne)
|Soul Train Music Award for Song of the Year
|
|-
|rowspan="3"|"Knock You Down" (with Kanye West and Ne-Yo)
|Soul Train Music Award for Best Collaboration
|
|-
|Soul Train Music Award for Record of the Year
|
|-
|rowspan="4" style="text-align:center;"|2010
|Grammy Award for Best Rap/Sung Collaboration
|
|-
|rowspan="2"|Herself
|Grammy Award for Best New Artist
|
|-
|NAACP Image Award for Outstanding New Artist
|
|-
|"Got Your Back" (T.I. featuring Keri Hilson)
|Soul Train Music Award for Best Hip-Hop Song
|
|-
|rowspan="4" style="text-align:center;"|2011
|"Pretty Girl Rock"
|BET Award for Video of the Year
|
|-
|rowspan="2"|Herself
|BET Award for Best Female R&B Artist
|
|-
|Get Schooled Award
|
|-
|"Pretty Girl Rock"
|Soul Train Music Award for Best Dance Performance
|
|-
|rowspan="1" style="text-align:center;"|2019
|rowspan="1"|Herself
|Power of Women Fundraising Gala honored with The Philanthropy Award 
|
|}

References

External links 

Living people
1982 births
21st-century American actresses
21st-century American women singers
African-American women singers
African-American actresses
African-American women singer-songwriters
American conspiracy theorists
American contemporary R&B singers
American dance musicians
American women hip hop musicians
American women pop singers
American women singer-songwriters
American film actresses
American hip hop singers
American philanthropists
American rhythm and blues singer-songwriters
Dance-pop musicians
Interscope Records artists
People from Decatur, Georgia
Southern hip hop musicians
21st-century American singers
Singer-songwriters from Georgia (U.S. state)
Emory College alumni